Louisiana Highway 6 (LA 6) is a state highway located in western central Louisiana.  It runs  in an east–west direction from the Texas state line southwest of Many to U.S. Highway 71 (US 71) and U.S. Highway 84 (US 84) in Clarence.

The route connects Many and Natchitoches, the seats of the two parishes it traverses, Sabine and Natchitoches.  The bridge over the Toledo Bend Reservoir at the west end of LA 6 provides the only crossing of the state line between US 84 at Logansport,  to the north, and LA 191 west of Leesville,  to the south.

LA 6 is also steeped in history, as it roughly follows the El Camino Real de los Tejas, a National Historic Trail, and passes through Natchitoches, the oldest permanent settlement in the Louisiana Purchase.  Its significance as a scenic route has been recognized by its inclusion as part of the Louisiana Colonial Trails, one of the state-designated Louisiana Scenic Byways.

Route description

Toledo Bend Reservoir to Natchitoches
From the west, LA 6 begins at the Texas state line, continuing the route of Texas State Highway 21 (SH 21) midway across a bridge over the Toledo Bend Reservoir.

LA 6 enters Many on San Antonio Avenue and intersects US 171, which heads northwest to Zwolle and south to Leesville.  After passing through the center of town, LA 6 makes a zigzag to the north and east then intersects LA 1217 (Marthaville Road).   northeast of Many, LA 6 passes near the Fort Jesup State Historic Site, which is served by LA 3118, a short loop off the main road.   later, LA 6 crosses from Sabine Parish into Natchitoches Parish.

Continuing northeast into Natchitoches Parish, LA 6 enters the village of Robeline on Texas Street.  At Oak Street, LA 6 intersects LA 120, which heads northwest to Marthaville.  Just beyond Robeline is an intersection with LA 485, which heads to Powhatan, northwest of Natchitoches.   later, at a point known as Hagewood, LA 6 intersects LA 117 north of Provencal.

 past Hagewood, LA 6 enters the far western city limit of Natchitoches, the parish seat of Natchitoches Parish, and widens to a divided four-lane highway as it passes through an interchange with I-49 at exit 138.  I-49 connects to Shreveport to the northwest and Alexandria to the southeast.  Immediately afterward, LA 6 intersects LA 504, which passes around the west side of Sibley Lake.  It then intersects LA 3278, and the median gives way to a center turning lane.

Natchitoches to Clarence
Approaching the main part of town, LA 6 again becomes a divided four-lane highway as it reaches a four-way intersection at the Natchitoches Bypass. Here, LA 1 heads southeast on the bypass toward Alexandria; LA 6 Bus. continues straight through town on University Parkway; and mainline LA 6 turns north onto the bypass co-signed with LA 1. Continuing northward, LA 1 and LA 6 intersect LA 1 Bus. and LA 3191 (Texas Street). Shortly afterward, LA 6 turns to the northeast and separates from LA 1, passing along the north side of town. At a T-intersection with Washington Street, LA 6 rejoins the business route and turns north away from town.

 later, at a point known as Grand Ecore, LA 6 crosses a beam bridge over the Red River.  It then curves east and intersects LA 486, the Campti Cutoff.  Soon afterward, LA 6 enters the village of Clarence and intersects LA 1225 (Jefferson Highway).  Immediately after crossing the Kansas City Southern Railway (KCS) tracks, LA 6 reaches its eastern terminus at a four-way intersection with US 71 and US 84.  From this intersection, US 71 heads southeast to Alexandria; US 84 heads east to Winnfield; and northbound US 71 and westbound US 84 head northwest concurrently toward Coushatta.

Byway designation
The entirety of LA 6 is part of the Louisiana Colonial Trails in the state-designated system of tourist routes known as the Louisiana Scenic Byways.

History
In the original Louisiana Highway system in use between 1921 and 1955, the modern LA 6 comprised the western segment of the original State Route 6, a rare case of numerical duplication between the two systems.  While Route 6 was a cross-state route, the current highway only covers one-third of its counterpart's former route.  From the present eastern terminus in Clarence, Route 6 continued eastward through Winnfield, Jena, Jonesville, and Ferriday to the Mississippi state line at Vidalia, located opposite the Mississippi River from Natchez.  In 1934, US 84 was extended west into Louisiana over this route.  While the pre-1955 system maintained state route designations on all U.S. Highways in the state, the 1955 Louisiana Highway renumbering eliminated unnecessary concurrencies of this sort, leaving only US 84 on the eastern segment.

Since the 1955 renumbering, the route of LA 6 has seen no major alignment changes apart from its shift onto a bypass around Natchitoches around the 1990s.  LA 1 and LA 6 originally followed their current business routes through town.  In 1975, the Natchitoches Bypass (constructed as LA 3110) was opened, relocating LA 1 on its current route, looping around the south and west side of town.  LA 1 Bus. and LA 3191 were created at this time to cover the original route.  Around 1980, a road was constructed to connect LA 6 with the LA 1 bypass on the north side of town.  It was originally designated as LA 3175 and became part of LA 6 by the mid-1990s.  LA 6 then became concurrent with LA 1 running along Sibley Lake, and LA 6 Bus. was created along the original route through Natchitoches.

Other alignment changes have resulted from the construction of bridges and the smoothing out of curves along much of the route.  LA 6 originally entered Louisiana by crossing the Sabine River on a bridge built in 1937 at the former community of Pendleton, Texas.  The current bridge, much longer in length, was constructed in 1963 when the river became part of the Toledo Bend Reservoir.  Two miles of previously dry land at the western end of LA 6, an area formerly known as East Pendleton, are now under water crossed by the current bridge, which follows a slightly straighter alignment than the old road.  Approaching the eastern terminus at Clarence, LA 6 originally crossed the Red River at Grand Ecore on a now-demolished bridge that existed immediately to the east of the current span built in 1959.

Much of LA 6 between Many and Natchitoches was reconstructed around the 1970s, straightening several sharp curves and zigzags.  Fragments of the original route surviving today as local roads include: Shawnee Town Loop northeast of Many; Stoker Loop immediately northeast of Fort Jesup; Stewart Loop and Clower Loop between Fort Jesup and Robeline; Parish Road 648 (Johnny Floyd Road) northeast of Robeline; and Parish Road 542 (Old LA 6) on the west side of I-49.  Two additional segments are still part of the state highway system.  The first, LA 3118, serves the bypassed Fort Jesup State Historic Site.  The second, LA 3278, is located at the west end of Natchitoches adjacent to I-49.

Major intersections

Business route

Louisiana Highway 6 Business (LA 6 Bus.) follows the original route of LA 6 through Natchitoches prior to its re-routing onto the Natchitoches Bypass around the 1990s.

From the intersection of LA 1 and LA 6 on the west side of town, LA 6 Bus. heads east on University Parkway, a divided four-lane roadway.  As it passes alongside the Northwestern State University campus, the roadway narrows to two lanes with a center turning lane.  Reaching an intersection with LA 1223 (Mill Street), LA 6 Bus. turns northward onto Jefferson Street, an undivided two-lane roadway, and enters the Natchitoches Historic District.  Now running along the west bank of the Cane River Lake, LA 6 Bus. intersects LA 494 (Keyser Avenue), which traverses the eastern part of town on the opposite bank.  Entering the downtown area, the roadway maintains a brick surface in keeping with its historic surroundings.  At Church Street, LA 6 Bus. intersects LA 1 Bus. and LA 3191.  Leaving the downtown area, LA 6 makes a slight jog onto Washington Street where it regains its modern road surface.   later, LA 6 Bus. rejoins its parent route, which intersects from the west.

See also

Notes

References

External links

Maps / GIS Data Homepage, Louisiana Department of Transportation and Development

0006
Transportation in Sabine Parish, Louisiana
Transportation in Natchitoches Parish, Louisiana